Kim Pyong-il (born 10 August 1954) is the younger paternal half-brother of the former leader of North Korea, Kim Jong-il, and the only surviving son of former leader and president of North Korea Kim Il-sung. He worked as a diplomat and lived overseas between 1979 and 2019, serving in various diplomatic positions such as ambassador of North Korea to Hungary, Bulgaria, Finland, Poland, and the Czech Republic.

Family background and early life
Kim is the son of Kim Il-sung and Kim Song-ae, Kim Il-sung's former secretary. Kim had one younger brother, Yong-il, and one older half-sister, Kyong-hui, who would go on to marry senior official Chang Sung-taek. He was named after another son with the same name, who was born in Vyatskoye in 1944; that son, also known as Shura Kim, allegedly drowned in Pyongyang in 1947. He graduated from Kim Il-sung University with a major in economics, and later attended the Kim Il-sung National War College, following which he was appointed a battalion commander.

Kim Pyong-il's rivalry with half-brother Kim Jong-il goes back to the 1970s. In those days, Kim Pyong-il was known as a womaniser who threw raucous parties; sometimes, attendees at these parties would shout, "Long live Kim Pyong-il!". Kim Jong-il knew that this could be portrayed as a threat to the cult of personality surrounding their father Kim Il-sung, and reported the matter; Kim Il-sung was reportedly infuriated, and thus Kim Pyong-il fell out of favour with his father while Kim Jong-il strengthened his position.

Kim Pyong-il married Kim Sun-kum, a woman with family connections to the Ministry of Public Security, in 1982. They have a son, Kim In-kang, and a daughter, Kim Ung-song.

Diplomatic career
In 1979, Kim began a series of diplomatic postings to several countries in Europe so that he could not influence politics in his home country. His first overseas assignment was in the Socialist Federal Republic of Yugoslavia. He was promoted to the position of ambassador to the People's Republic of Hungary in 1988, but was transferred to the People's Republic of Bulgaria in response to Hungary's opening of diplomatic relations with South Korea in 1989. This was followed by a posting in Finland.

In 1998, after North Korea closed its embassy in Finland to save money and prevent defections, Kim was posted to Poland. His ambassadorship was initially suggested to be in limbo, as nine months after his posting he had yet to formally present his credentials to the Polish president. However, he remained as ambassador in Poland, and his daughter Kim Eun-song and son Kim In-kang went on to attend university in Poland. He was a rare sight in Warsaw's diplomatic community, only occasionally appearing at functions held by the Algerian, Russian and Syrian embassies.

In 2015, he was transferred to the Czech Republic. He later returned to North Korea in November 2019 after stepping down as North Korea's ambassador to the Czech Republic. In January 2020, Ju Won Chol, a former Director General of the North Korean Ministry of Foreign Affairs (MFA) Second European Department, replaced Kim as North Korea's Czech Republic ambassador.

Relations with Pyongyang
Kim Pyong-il reportedly continued to be considered a threat to the North Korean government due to his resemblance to his father Kim Il-sung. Reports claim he is under watch by both North and South Korean intelligence. However, he has kept a low profile, in contrast to his half-nephew Kim Jong-nam who gave frequent interviews with Japanese media, before he was assassinated in Kuala Lumpur in 2017.

In July 2011, Kim was reported by South Korean media to be back in Pyongyang for a visit. Some sources claimed he was under house arrest there since May, though others speculated he was just visiting his dying mother Kim Song-ae or preparing to observe the anniversary of his father's death.

In December 2011, South Korean officials said Kim Pyong-il was in Poland and would not attend Kim Jong-il's funeral. Kim Pyong-il and Kim Song-ae attended the funeral of Kim Il-sung in 1994, but North Korean television broadcasts deleted their images.

In June 2019, Kim Pyong-il visited North Korea for reported medical reasons. In November 2019, Kim Pyong-il returned to North Korea after retiring from a long career as a foreign diplomat. He had not lived in either Pyongyang or the rest of his native country since 1979. As a result, his return to North Korea following his retirement as a foreign diplomat also marked his return to being a North Korean resident for the first time in 40 years.

Family tree

See also
Kim family (North Korea)
Politics of North Korea

Notes

References

Works cited

External links
Korean Monarch Kim Jong Il: Technocrat Ruler of the Hermit Kingdom Facing the Challenge of Modernity, by Alexandre Y. Mansourov, Ph.D., Associate Professor, Asia-Pacific Center for Security Studies
The Kim Jong Il Succession Problem in the Context of the North Korean Political Structure, translated by Titus North, University of Pittsburgh

1954 births
Living people
Ambassadors of North Korea to Bulgaria
Ambassadors of North Korea to Hungary
Ambassadors of North Korea to Finland
Ambassadors of North Korea to Poland
People from Pyongyang
Workers' Party of Korea politicians
Kim dynasty (North Korea)
Kim Il-sung University alumni
Children of national leaders